Maja Söderström (born September 27, 2011) is a Swedish child actress. She had a leading role in the 2018 SVT Christmas calendar "Storm på Lugna gatan" with the role as "Vilja" in the family Storm. Söderström also participated in the UNICEF-gala which was broadcast on TV4 on 1 May 2019. Currently, she is the Swedish dubber for Elinor in Elinor Wonders Why.

References

External links 

21st-century Swedish actresses
Living people
2011 births
 Swedish child actresses
 Swedish television actresses